The Social Democratic Union (SDU) is a minority interest political party in Kosovo representing Bosniaks. It was founded by Duda Balje, who is also the party’s only Assembly Member. Balje was a member of the Vakat Coalition in the 2019 legislative elections, who then later moved to the LDK parliamentary group. 

The party ran in the 2021 legislative elections getting 2,549 votes, initially failing to get any representation in the Assembly. However, the party made a complaint to the Election Complaints and Appeals Panel (PZAP in Albanian) over the irregularity of votes received by the Vakat Coalition and the United Community led by Adrijana Hodžić. This complaint was accepted and the Election Complaints and Appeals Panel decided to annul 4,205 votes from Serb-majority municipalities. This meant that the United Community did not receive enough votes to enter the parliament, while SDU gained representation in the Assembly winning 1 seat. This decision was later confirmed by the Supreme Court of Kosovo. 

The party currently has a confidence and supply agreement with the LVV-led government, and the party voted for the LVV-backed candidate Vjosa Osmani in the 2021 Kosovan presidential election.

Electoral performance

References

Bosniak political parties
Political parties of minorities in Kosovo
Social democratic parties in Kosovo